Gido Kokars (16 August 1921 – 10 March 2017) was a Latvian conductor. He was the twin brother of Imants Kokars, also a conductor.

References

External links

1921 births
2017 deaths
People from Gulbene
Latvian twins
Latvian conductors (music)
Male conductors (music)
Choral conductors
Soviet conductors (music)
People's Artists of the Latvian Soviet Socialist Republic
Recipients of the Cross of Recognition